Kingshouse was a railway station located at the hamlet of Kingshouse, Stirling where the road from Balquhidder joins the A84. The only building of note locally to the station was the Kingshouse Hotel. In 2013 it was refurbished and opened under new management as the Mhor 84 Hotel.

History 
This station opened on 21 June 1871 with a single platform on the east side of the line. It was closed on 28 September 1965 following a landslide in Glen Ogle.

References

Sources 
 
 

Disused railway stations in Stirling (council area)
Beeching closures in Scotland
Railway stations in Great Britain opened in 1871
Railway stations in Great Britain closed in 1965
Former Caledonian Railway stations